Pseudozonaria is a genus of sea snails, marine gastropod mollusks in the subfamily Zonariinae of the family Cypraeidae, the cowries.

Species
Species within the genus Pseudozonaria include:
Pseudozonaria arabicula (Lamarck, 1811)
Pseudozonaria annettae (Dall, 1909)
Pseudozonaria nigropunctata (Gray, 1828)
Pseudozonaria robertsi (Hidalgo, 1906)
Synonyms
 Pseudozonaria aequinoctialis (Schilder, 1933): synonym of Pseudozonaria annettae aequinoctialis  (Schilder, 1933) (No conchological or molecular differentiation to warrant species recognition)

References

 Schilder, M. & Schilder, F. A. (1971) A catalogue of living and fossil cowries. A taxonomy and bibliography of Triviacea and Cypraeacea (Gastropoda Prosobranchia). Institut Royal des Sciences Naturelles de Belgique, Mémoires, Deuxième Series, 85: 1-246
 Dolin L. & Lozouet P. (2004). Nouvelles espèces de gastéropodes (Mollusca: Gastropoda) de l'Oligocène et du Miocène inférieur de l'Aquitaine (Sud-Ouest de la France). Partie 3. Cypraeidae et Ovulidae. Cossmanniana. Hors-série 4: 1-164.

Cypraeidae